A stieda process refers to an elongated lateral tubercle of the talus.

Skeletal system
Bones of the lower limb
Bones of the foot
Tarsal bones